Imdad Hussaini (10 March 1940 – 27 August 2022) was a Pakistani Sindhi poet and an Urdu language writer.

Early life and career
Imdad Hussaini was a poet, short story writer, scholar and a lyricist. Many singers including Abida Parveen, Bilquis Khanum, Arshad Mehmood, Robina Qureshi and Zarina Baloch have sung his songs for Radio Pakistan and Pakistan Television. He was born in Tikharu, a village on the left bank of the river Indus in Hyderabad District, Sindh. His father's name was Syed Fazal Mohammed Shah, who was the first cousin of Syed Miran Mohammad Shah. Syed Imdad Hussaini was an educationist or a professor by profession. He did M.A in Sindhi literature. He worked in various literary Institutions of Sindh, such as the Sindhi Adabi Board, the Sindh Text Book Board, the Institute of Sindhology and served as a member of Board of Governors of the Sindhi Language Authority. He was Secretary of Sindhi Adabi Board during 1992–1993, editor of Sindhi Adabi Board's literary journal, Mehran (quarterly) from 1977 to 1979 and its Managing Editor from 2004 to 2006.

Death
Hussaini died on 27 August 2022 in Karachi after a prolonged illness.

Published works
 Hawa Jay Samhoon
 Shehar
 Imdad Aahay Rol
 Kirnay Jehro Pal

He translated in Urdu, Mirza Qaleech Baig's novel Zeenat; Urdu translation by Imdad Hussaini; published by Pakistan Academy of Letters, Islamabad in 1978.

He also translated a historical epic tale (originating about a thousand years ago) of Sindh in Urdu:
 Dodo Chanesar,  Urdu translation by Imdad Hussaini; published by the National Institute of Folk and Traditional Heritage, Islamabad in 1975.

He compiled two books:
 Sindh je Deeni Adab jo Catalogue,  published by Institute of Sindhology in 1971
  Mual Manhoo Jeeari Peeda by Tikhur Publications

Awards and recognition
Pride of Performance Award by the President of Pakistan in 2003
Josh Malihabadi Lifetime Achievement Award in 2007
 Allama Iqbal Award for Urdu poetry for his book Dhoop Kiran in 2016

See also
 List of Pakistani writers
 List of Sindhi language poets
 Sindhi literature
 Sindhi poetry

References

1940 births
2022 deaths
20th-century male writers
20th-century Pakistani poets
Sindhi-language poets
Sindhi people
Pakistani male poets
People from Hyderabad, Sindh
Recipients of the Pride of Performance